Rise of a Star (Original French title: Naissance d'une Étoile) is a 2017 French drama short film directed by James Bort and written by Stéphane Landowski. Produced for  FullDawa Films (founded by Boris Mendza, Gaël Cabouat and David Atrakchi), it was shot at the Palais Garnier, home of the Paris Opera Ballet. It was shortlisted for the Academy Award for Best Live Action Short Film at the 90th Academy Awards in 2018.

Synopsis 
Emma is a celebrated ballerina bothered by a secret capable of undermining the achievement of her lifelong dream.

Cast
Source:
 Dorothée Gilbert as Emma
 Catherine Deneuve as Mrs Jean
 Pierre Deladonchamps as Youri
 Antonia Desplat as Victoire

Release 
The film premiered at the Tribeca Film Festival in 2018.

Reception 
Le Journal du Centre reviewed the short favorably, praising Bort as a first-time director.

References 
#

External links
 

French short films